The 1893–94 Scottish Districts season is a record of all the  rugby union matches for Scotland's district teams.

History

Glasgow District beat Edinburgh District in the Inter-City match.

The Glasgow Herald makes the mistake of assuming every Inter-City fixture was an annual fixture in its report; in concluding that the Inter-City Glasgow - Edinburgh match started in 1858.

The East v West match was scheduled for February 1894. However it was played, as normal, at the end of January.

A joint Glasgow-Edinburgh side was selected for the first time. The team was to play a Rest Of Scotland side.

It was noted that the weather was so bad for the South v Cumberland match that few spectators turned up; and the pitch was almost unplayable. In addition two South players were replaced, as the first team players of Gala and Melrose were not represented at all: Renwick, the reserve Gala half-back; and McGregor, the captain of Gala Thistle had to be called in. These players evidently replaced Frater of Melrose and Dalgleish of Gala.

The list of fixtures for the season was reported by the Glasgow Evening Post of 6 May 1893 as:

FOOTBALL. SCOTTISH RUGBY FIXTURES.—The annual meeting of the Rugby football secretaries was held last evening at the Royal Hotel, Edinburgh. The list of representative matches arranged by J. E. Smith, honorary secretary of the Scottish Union, was presented as follows :
December 2 Inter city, Glasgow;December 9 — Edinburgh v North, Dundee; December 9. Glasgow v South, at GalashielsDecember 25 - Edinburgh and Glasgow [Cities District] v Scotland [Provinces District] at GlasgowJanuary 15 — North v. South at Edinburgh

Results

Inter-City

Glasgow District:

Edinburgh District:

Other Scottish matches

South of Scotland District:

Glasgow District: 

North of Scotland District:

Edinburgh District: 

Cities:

Provinces: 

North of Scotland District:

South of Scotland District: 

East of Scotland District:

West of Scotland District:

English matches

South of Scotland District: Smith (Langholm) (back). Grieve (Hawick), Tom Scott (Langholm), Crozier (Jedburgh), and W. Oliver (Jedburgh) (half-backs), Mabon and W. Oliver (Jedburgh) (three-quarter-backs). Dalgleish (Galashiels)*, Cairns (Langholm), Frater (Melrose)*, Elliot (Hawick), and Hunter, Douglas. Johnstone, and Rennilson (Jedburgh). [*Replaced by Renwick (Gala) and McGregor (Gala Thistle)]

Cumberland:

International matches

No touring matches this season.

References

1893–94 in Scottish rugby union
Scottish Districts seasons